James Patrick Nolan (11 August 1893 – 16 December 1973) was an Australian rules footballer who played with Melbourne in the Victorian Football League (VFL).

Family
Nolan was one of 16 children born to John and Bridget Nolan (née Curtis) of Garvoc. His eldest sister Margaret was murdered by Henry Morgan in what became known as the Panmure murder.

References

External links 

 

1893 births
1973 deaths
Australian rules footballers from Victoria (Australia)
Melbourne Football Club players